Pagouda is a city in Togo with 13,200 inhabitants (2004), near the border of Benin. It is the seat of Binah prefecture in Kara Region.

Populated places in Kara Region